Khomuty is a rural locality (a khutor) in Starobzhegokayskoye Rural Settlement of Takhtamukaysky District, the Republic of Adygea, Russia. The population was 609 as of 2018. There are 22 streets.

Geography 
Khomuty is located 22 km northwest of Takhtamukay (the district's administrative centre) by road. Yablonovsky is the nearest rural locality.

References 

Rural localities in Takhtamukaysky District